Inchcape or the Bell Rock is a reef about  off the east coast of Angus, Scotland, near Dundee and Fife, occupied by the Bell Rock Lighthouse. The name Inchcape comes from the Scottish Gaelic Innis Sgeap, meaning "Beehive isle", probably comparing the shape of the reef to old-style skep beehives. According to legend, probably folk etymology, the alternative name Bell Rock derives from a 14th-century attempt by the Abbot of Arbroath ("Aberbrothock") to install a warning bell on the reef; the bell was removed by a Dutch pirate who perished a year later on the rocks, a story that is immortalised in "The Inchcape Rock" (1802), a poem by Robert Southey.

The main hazard the reef presents to shipping is that only a relatively small proportion of it is above water, but a large section of the surrounding area is extremely shallow and dangerous.

The rock was featured in a one-hour episode of the BBC's Seven Wonders of the Industrial World, which told the story of the Bell Rock Lighthouse's construction. Work began in 1807 and was largely completed by 1810.

Geology
Inchcape is formed of the Old Red Sandstone exposed in the nearby coastal areas, and of which Arbroath Abbey is built. Robert Stevenson, the engineer who designed and built the lighthouse on the rock, estimated that the "greatest length, therefore, of the Bell Rock, which may be said to be dangerous to shipping, is about 1427 feet (435m), and its greatest breadth is about 300 feet (91.4m)."

See also
 List of outlying islands of Scotland

References

External links
 Bell Rock website
 NLB Bell Rock page

Islands of the North Sea
Skerries of Scotland
Landforms of Angus, Scotland
Reefs of Scotland